The 2011–12 Moldovan "A" Division season was the 21st season of Moldovan "A" Division since its establishment. A total of 16 teams contested the league.

Teams

League table

Round by round

Results

References

External links
Divizia A - Moldova - Results, fixtures, tables and news - Soccerway

Moldovan Liga 1 seasons
2
Moldova 2